(pl. anni horribiles) is a Latin phrase, meaning "horrible year".

Origin of phrase
The phrase  was used in 1891 in an Anglican publication to describe 1870, the year in which the dogma of papal infallibility was defined in the Roman Catholic Church.

Elizabeth II

1992
The expression was brought to prominence by Queen Elizabeth II. In a speech at Guildhall on 24 November 1992, marking her Ruby Jubilee on the throne, she said:

The "sympathetic correspondent" was later revealed to be her former assistant private secretary, Sir Edward Ford. The unpleasant events which happened to the royal family in this year include:
 Publication of photographs pertaining to an affair between Sarah, Duchess of York, and Texan oil millionaire Steve Wyatt (18 January)
 Separation of the Queen's second son Prince Andrew, Duke of York, from his wife Sarah (19 March)
 Divorce of the Queen's daughter, Anne, Princess Royal, from Captain Mark Phillips (23 April)
 Publication of Diana, Princess of Wales' tell-all book Diana: Her True Story, revealing the problems in her marriage to the Queen's eldest son, Charles, Prince of Wales particularly his affair with Camilla Parker Bowles (The Sunday Times, 7 June)
 Publication of photographs of Sarah, Duchess of York, sunbathing topless with her friend John Bryan (20 August)
 Publication of intimate conversations between Diana and James Gilbey from a tape recording of their phone calls (24 August)
 Fire in Windsor Castle, one of the Queen's official residences (20 November)

After her speech had been recorded, one more notable event transpired: the separation of Charles and Diana (9 December).

2019
2019 was described by some commentators as a second  for the British royal family. It was the year the 97-year-old Prince Philip crashed his car into another carrying two women and a baby. Later on, Prince Andrew took part in a universally-criticised BBC Newsnight interview about his relationship with convicted child-sex offender Jeffrey Epstein. The Queen was also involved in a constitutional crisis regarding the prime minister Boris Johnson requesting that parliament be prorogued (this advice was later ruled to be unlawful), and there was increased tabloid scrutiny regarding rifts between the Cambridge and Sussex households.

Kofi Annan 
Kofi Annan, then United Nations Secretary-General, used the phrase in his year-end press conference on 21 December 2004. He reflected: "There's no doubt that this has been a particularly difficult year, and I am relieved that this  is coming to an end." His remarks were widely interpreted as having alluded to persistent allegations of corruption in the UN's Iraq Oil-for-Food Program. He also spoke of upheaval and violence in Afghanistan, the Democratic Republic of the Congo, Iraq, Palestine, and Sudan; the ongoing process of UN internal reform; and "persistent...criticism against the UN" and himself personally. Annan's remarks came five days before the deadliest event of the year (and one of the deadliest natural disasters in history), the Indian Ocean tsunami on 26 December, when 227,898 people died.

Juan Carlos I 
In 2007, the Spanish royal family, in particular King Juan Carlos I, faced a difficult year. Family tragedy and a series of controversies led Spanish newspapers to refer to the year as the king's .
 In February, Érika Ortiz Rocasolano, the youngest sister of Letizia, then the Princess of Asturias, died of a sedative overdose in her apartment.
 In July, a humour magazine, published a drawing that ran on the cover, depicting Felipe VI (then the Prince of Asturias), and the aforementioned Princess Letizia having sex, with a caption reading: "Just imagine if you end up pregnant. This will be the closest thing to work I've ever done in my life." It satirized a proposal by the government to give 2,500 euros to the parents of newborn children. The magazine was banned and removed from distribution, which led to a censorship controversy.
 In September, Catalan separatists were tried for having burned photographs of King Juan Carlos and Queen Sofía at an anti-monarchy and Catalan separatist rally in Girona while the royal couple toured the city.
 In early November at the XVII Ibero-American Summit, after a verbal altercation between Hugo Chávez, President of Venezuela, and José Luis Rodríguez Zapatero, Prime Minister of Spain, the king asked Chávez,  ("Why don't you shut up?").
 Shortly after the summit, the royal house announced the separation of the king's daughter, the Duchess of Lugo, and her husband, Jaime de Marichalar. The couple have two children, Felipe and Victoria.

2020 
At the end of the year, Netflix released Death to 2020, a mockumentary discussing the events of the year.

See also
 List of Latin phrases
 Rampjaar, the Dutch "disaster year" of 1672

References

External links

 Royal.gov.uk – Transcript of The Queen's speech at Guildhall 24 November 1992
 Annus Horribilis: 365 Tales of Comic Misfortune : book by Sam Jordison

Latin words and phrases
1992 in the United Kingdom
2007 in Spain
Elizabeth II
Spanish monarchy